The XVI Grand Prix de Reims, also known as the I Grand Prix de Reims, was a Formula One motor race held on 6 July 1947, at the Reims-Gueux circuit near Reims in north-eastern France. The race was run over 51 laps on a 7.816 km circuit of public roads and was won by Swiss driver Christian Kautz in a Maserati 4CL.

History 
The 1947 Grand Prix at Reims (commonly known as the Reims Grand Prix) was the first major Grand Prix motor race held at Reims-Gueux after WW2. Officially billed as the XVI Grand Prix de Reims, the race number has its origin in the Grand Prix de la Marne, a pre-war Grand Prix racing series (1925-1937, plus one commemorative race held in 1952).

Post war political and financial re-organization moved the nationally sanctioned Grand Prix de France (Grand Prix de l'ACF) to the circuit Rouen-Les-Essarts after three editions were held at Reims in 1932, 1938 and 1939. Among those changes was renaming the old pre-war Marne GP to Grand Prix de Reims, officially billed as the XVI Grand Prix de Reims, based on the former Grand Prix de la Marne numbering sequence. Conflicts between local, regional, national and commercial interests, further complicated by the new post-war Formula 1 and Formula 2 series, led to various accounts of race name and numbering formats. As a result, some sources list the 1957 and 1962 Grand Prix de Reims as the 2nd (II)  and 3rd (III) GP de Reims respectively.

Results

References

External links 
 Maserati - 100 Years - 1947
 Circuit de Reims - History
 Circuits: Reims
 Circuit Reims-Gueux (1926-1969) on Google Maps (Historic Grand Prix Circuits)

Reims
Reims Grand Prix